El Hispano News is a Spanish language newspaper circulated throughout the Dallas-Fortworth area. The Hispanic-oriented newspaper was established in 1986 in Dallas, Texas, and serves its Spanish-speaking community. The paper originally began as a twelve-page tabloid until it changed its format to broadsheet in 1987 and began circulating 15,000 copies. By 1993, the paper had launched a Hispanic Total Market Coverage program. The program resulted in 90 percent coverage of the Hispanic market. The program includes a special edition issue, circulating 75,000 copies during holidays largely celebrated by the Hispanic community.

Resources
El Hispano News

References

Dallas County, Texas
Weekly newspapers published in Texas
Spanish-language newspapers published in Texas